Nagavally Rama Kurup Sreedhara Kurup, popularly known as Nagavally (1917  27 December 2003), was an Indian writer, commentator and broadcaster best known for his works in the All India Radio. He was the father of the Malayalam actor and director Venu Nagavally. He authored over 50 literary works including plays and around 20 film scripts. He penned the script for the Malayalam film Newspaper Boy which is regarded as the first neo-realist movie in Malayalam.

He was honoured by the Kerala Sahithya Akademi for his overall contributions to Malayalam literature. The Kerala Sangeetha Nataka Akademi also honoured him with Kerala Sangeetha Nataka Akademi Award in 1993.

Early life and career
Nagavally R. Sreedhara Kurup was born to Adv P. M. Rama Kurup and Kuttiyamma at Ramankary village in Kuttanad of Alappuzha district in 1917. He had his primary education from Sanatana Dharma Vidyasala High School, Alappuzha, St. Berchmans College and Maharaja's College, Ernakulam. He wrote articles on Malayarajyam weekly, Kollam. After his graduation, he started his career with the Indian Bank but left it to join the SD College, Alappuzha, as a lecturer in the Department of Psychology and worked there for 9 years. In 1951, he joined All India Radio. He was senior producer at the time of his retirement from AIR in 1977.

Personal life
He was married to Rajamma. The couple had four children Venu Nagavally, Ramachandran, Vasundara and Lalithambi.

Contributions
Movies
 Amma (1952) - Scriptwriter 
 Newspaper Boy (1955) -  Scriptwriter 
 Bhakta Kuchela (1961)
 Sreerama Pattabhishekam (1962)
 Kumara Sambhavam (1969) - Screenplay
 Sree Guruvayoorappan (1972) - Screenplay
 Devi Kanyakumari (1974) - Scriptwriter
 Chottanikkara Amma (1976) - Scriptwriter
 Hridayam Oru Kshethram (1976) - Scriptwriter
 Jagadguru Aadisankaran (1977)
 Randu Janmam (1978) - Director  
 Bhaktha Hanuman (1980) - Written by

References

External links

1917 births
2003 deaths
Screenwriters from Kerala
All India Radio people
Film directors from Kerala
People from Alappuzha district
Indian broadcasters
20th-century Indian dramatists and playwrights
Malayalam screenwriters
20th-century Indian film directors
Malayalam film directors
20th-century Indian screenwriters
Recipients of the Kerala Sangeetha Nataka Akademi Award